Each nation brought their under-20 teams to compete in a group and knockout tournament. The top teams and the best second placed team advanced to the knockout stage of the competition. France won the tournament after defeating Egypt 3-2.

Group stage

Group A

Group B

Group C

Knockout stage

See also
Football at the Jeux de la Francophonie

Jeux de la Francophonie
1994 Jeux de la Francophonie
1994
1994–95 in French football
1994–95 in Moroccan football
1994 in Canadian soccer